Silene caliacrae is a species of campion endemic to the Bulgarian Black Sea coast.

Description
The leaves are opposite and entire.

Distribution
Silene caliacrae is only found in Bulgaria, in crevices of limestone rocks close to the coast. It has two areas of occurrence, one near the mouth of the Rezovska river on the Turkish border, and a second between Shabla and Albena.

References

caliacrae
Endemic flora of Bulgaria
Plants described in 1966